Lepidodexia is a genus of flesh flies in the family Sarcophagidae. There are at least 170 described species in Lepidodexia.

See also
 List of Lepidodexia species

References

Further reading

External links

 
 

Sarcophagidae
Oestroidea genera